Celestial Skies  is the third studio album from the band This World. It was released in 2013. It is the first This World album to feature Kate Kohler on background vocals.

Composition and recording

The album is constructed in such a way that the first two tracks are standalone, and then tracks 3-9 make up the Celestial Skies Suite. The Suite plays through continuously, typical of progressive rock concept albums. The lyrics of the suite reflect on a variety of themes, such as the passage of time ("Dali's Music Box," "Reprise"), the role of God in our lives ("Aurora Borealis," "Solar Sea"), and the nature of the universe ("Transmission"). The lyrics for the non-Suite songs reflect on love ("Be Love Today"), racism and intolerance ("Brave Heart"), and endurance in the face of emotional struggle ("Don't Look Away"). Every song on the album has music and lyrics by Lee Kohler, with the exception of "Transmission" with a rap performed Lee's son Matthew John Kohler, and the instrumental finale, "When We Were Young," composed by Rob Kohler. However, as with all of This World's work, many of the songs were created in collaboration between band members.

The album was recorded in Destin, Florida, New Orleans, Louisiana, and Los Angeles, California over a period of several years. After veteran This World drummer Clay Green was unavailable to perform on this album, Lee and Rob travelled to Denver, Colorado to record with their childhood friend, Mark Raynes.

Track listing

Personnel

This World
Lee Kohler – Multi-Keyboards, Rhythm Guitar, Lead Vocals
Rob Kohler – Basses, Lead Guitar
Mark Raynes – Drums Percussion
Kate Kohler – Background Vocals

Special Guests
Matthew Kohler – Vocal on "Transmission"
Anna Kohler – Vocal on "Be Love Today"
Sam Kohler – Cello on "Aurora Borealis"

Release

The album was released on December 29, 2013. Excerpts can be heard on the band's SoundCloud page.

References

2013 albums
This World (band) albums